Trinity Islands is a high-rise residential development complex under construction in Manchester, England, consisting of four towers between 39 and 60 storeys split over two  sites: Building D1 at , Building D2 at , Building C1 at  and Building C2 at . The project was designed by SimpsonHaugh and comprises 1,950 apartments, with a total build cost of £535m.

History

Original proposal
If built, this tower would have overtaken Deansgate Square South Tower to be the tallest building in Manchester, as well as the tallest building in the United Kingdom outside London. The scheme would have delivered around 1,390 homes, costing approximately £1.3 billion. This development was approved by Manchester City Council in July 2017.

Revised proposal
The site was subsequently sold to developer Renaker in 2018 for £13.4m, who redesigned the scheme and lodged an application for 1,950 apartments with Manchester City Council in December 2021. Planning approval was obtained in February 2022.

Construction
Construction of Trinity Islands Building D2 commenced in 2022.

See also 
 List of tallest buildings and structures in Manchester
 List of tallest buildings in the United Kingdom

References

External links 
 Trinity Islands SimpsonHaugh architects 
  Manchester City Council Planning Application 132429/FO/2021

Unfinished buildings and structures
Skyscrapers in Manchester
Residential buildings in Manchester
Residential skyscrapers in England
Apartment buildings in England